The 2001 Little League World Series took place between August 17 and August 26 in South Williamsport, Pennsylvania. The Kitasuna Little League of Tokyo, Japan defeated Apopka National Little League of Apopka, Florida in the championship game of the 55th Little League World Series. This tournament saw the expansion of pool play to 16 teams, eight from the United States, and eight from around the world. Little League Volunteer Stadium was built to accommodate the number of added games that would be played in the pool stage, and it would also host the consolation game.

Following the conclusion of the tournament, Danny Almonte, a pitcher from the team representing the Mid-Atlantic, would be the center of a scandal where it was discovered that Almonte was not eligible to play in the tournament because he was two years over the maximum age limit. Because of this, the Mid-Atlantic team was forced to forfeit every game in the tournament they participated in retroactively.

The 2001 Little League World Series was also the first ever that had a female umpire to call the championship game: Flora Stansbury from Seneca, Missouri. U.S. President George W. Bush, himself a little leaguer as a child, was also in attendance at the championship game.

Nobuhisa Baba's single in the bottom of the sixth drove in the winning run.

Qualification

Between five and twelve teams take part in 16 regional qualification tournaments, which vary in format depending on region. In the United States, the qualification tournaments are in the same format as the Little League World Series itself: a round-robin tournament followed by an elimination round to determine the regional champion.

Pool play
The top two teams in each pool moved on to the elimination round.

August 17

August 18

August 19

August 20

August 21

International

August 17

August 18

August 19

August 20

August 21

† Game ended by "mercy rule" (at least 10-run difference through 5 innings)

Elimination rounds

Champions path
The Kitasuna LL reached the LLWS with an undefeated record of four wins and no losses. In total, their record was 9–1, their only loss coming in the LLWS qualifying round against Santiago de Veraguas LL of Panama.

Notable players
 Danny Almonte
 Francisco Peña (Bronx, New York) Baltimore Orioles catcher. Son of Tony Peña
 Ruben Tejada (Santiago de Veraguas, Panama) Baltimore Orioles infielder

References

External links
2001 official results via Wayback Machine

Little League World Series
Little League World Series
Little League World Series